The 1979–80 Bowling Green Falcons men's basketball team represented Bowling Green State University during the 1979–80 men's college basketball season.

Schedule

|-
!colspan=9 style=| MAC Tournament

|-
!colspan=9 style=| NIT

References 

Bowling Green
Bowling Green Falcons
Bowling Green Falcons men's basketball seasons